The following is a list of pipeline accidents in the United States in 2002. It is one of several lists of U.S. pipeline accidents. See also list of natural gas and oil production accidents in the United States.

Incidents 
This is not a complete list of all pipeline accidents. For natural gas alone, the Pipeline and Hazardous Materials Safety Administration (PHMSA), a United States Department of Transportation agency, has collected data on more than 3,200 accidents deemed serious or significant since 1987.

A "significant incident" results in any of the following consequences:
 fatality or injury requiring in-patient hospitalization
 $50,000 or more in total costs, measured in 1984 dollars
 liquid releases of five or more barrels (42 US gal/barrel)
 releases resulting in an unintentional fire or explosion.

PHMSA and the National Transportation Safety Board (NTSB) post incident data and results of investigations into accidents involving pipelines that carry a variety of products, including natural gas, oil, diesel fuel, gasoline, kerosene, jet fuel, carbon dioxide, and other substances. Occasionally pipelines are repurposed to carry different products.

 On January 6, 2002, an El Paso Field Services natural gas pipeline was damaged at Schutenburg, Texas, when a log drift created by heavy rains and flooding hit the pipeline, creating longitudinal strain stressing a coupling, which separated. The coupling was located approximately 15' landward from the riverbank. The pipe depth at the location of the leak was 84 inches.
 On January 26, 2002, a Northern Natural Gas Company (Enron) underwater natural gas transmission pipeline sprung a leak through a pinhole rupture due to internal corrosion in the body of a 24-inch diameter pipe manufactured in 1981.
 On February 6, an 8-inch diesel pipeline was found to be leaking in Salt Lake City, Utah. About 14,600 gallons of fuel were leaked, with about 5,900 of it recovered. The cause was from external corrosion.  
 On February 8, a trenching machine with a new rock bit being tested hit a 20-inch diameter gas transmission pipeline in Noble County, Oklahoma, causing an explosion that killed the trencher operator.
 On February 20, in a “high consequence area”, at Longview, Texas, a Voyageur Pipeline natural gas gathering line leaked due to bacterial corrosion causing two holes in the pipe. Twelve people were evacuated from the area as a precautionary measure. The eight-inch diameter pipe was manufactured in 1956.
 On February 21, a Sunoco 12 inch pipeline was found to be leaking refined petroleum products, in Tinicum, Pennsylvania. About 15,000 gallons were spilled. The cause was external corrosion.
 On March 6, near Jeffersonville, Kentucky, a 26-inch diameter Tennessee Gas Pipeline ruptured in a compressor station yard, causing a fire and explosion that did more than $2 million in property damage. The failure originated at a manufacturing defect which caused a weld to crack. The pipe was manufactured in 1950. 30 families in the area voluntarily evacuated. There were no injuries.
 On March 13, a Buckeye Partners pipeline ruptured due to internal corrosion in Wren, Ohio, spilling about 1500 gallons of gasoline.
 On or about March 13, approximately 20 barrels of oil or jet fuel were discharged from a portion of the Plantation Pipeline in Alexandria, Virginia, some of which entered into an unnamed tributary of Hooff Run and its adjoining shorelines. The pipeline failure appears to have resulted from a hole in the pipeline caused by high-voltage arcing between the pipeline and a utility pole anchor.
 On March 15, a failure occurred on a 36-inch gas pipeline near Crystal Falls, Michigan. There were no deaths or injuries.
 On May 22, an 8-inch petroleum products pipeline failed, spilling about 2,000 barrels of unleaded gasoline on to a wheat field near Ottawa, Kansas. Booms had to be deployed in nearby creeks. The pipe failed along a seam, possibly due to LF-ERW pipeline failure issues.
 On May 29, 2002, a Central Hudson Gas & Electric Corporation pipeline at Poughkeepsie, New York leaked after being punctured by a driller who struck the 12-inch diameter gas transmission line. Because it was a “high consequence area,” 180 people were evacuated as a precautionary measure.
 On June 20, PHMSA ordered Columbia Gas Transmission Company to do extensive repair to one of their gas transmission pipelines in the states of Pennsylvania and New York, after finding extensive wall thinning on sections of that pipeline system caused by external corrosion. Approximately 800 anomalies with wall thickness losses of greater than 65 percent were found during a smart pig examination, with 76 of the found anomalies having a wall thickness loss of greater than 80 percent. Many of the affected sections of pipe were older sections lacking coating, which is known to reduce external corrosion on pipelines.
 On July 4, there was a rupture of an Enbridge Pipeline, and release of crude oil near Cohasset, Minnesota. The pipeline ruptured in a marsh in Itasca County, spilling  of crude oil. In an attempt to keep the oil from contaminating the Mississippi River, the Minnesota Department of Natural Resources set a controlled burn that lasted for one day and created a smoke plume about 1 mile (1.6 km) high and 5 miles (8 km) long. The pipe failed due to cracking caused by train shipping induced cracking of the pipe being delivered.
 On July 21, a overpressure incident at a Sunoco pipeline terminal, in Sinking Spring, Pennsylvania lead to a spill of about 18,900 gallons of gasoline. There were no injuries.
 On July 22, Kinder Morgan’s KN Interstate Gas Transmission 12-inch diameter natural gas pipeline at Lodgepole, Nebraska ruptured due to galvanic corrosion on an interior seam weld. The pipe was manufactured in 1954. The instantaneous release of gas was ignited, probably by overhead electric power lines. The fire burned farm crops in vicinity of rupture along with the power pole and some power lines.
 On July 24 a gas explosion leveled a Hopkinton, Massachusetts house, killing a 4-year-old girl and her 5-year-old sister. A failed sleeve on the gas line in the basement of the house was suspected of being the cause.
 On August 5, a natural gas pipeline exploded and caught fire west of Rt. 622, on Poca River Road near Lanham, West Virginia. Emergency workers evacuated three or four families. Kanawha and Putnam Counties in the area were requested to shelter in place. Parts of the pipeline were thrown hundreds of yards away, around and across Poca River. The fire was not contained for several hours because valves to shut down the line did not exist. The orange glow from the fire at 11 PM; could be seen for several miles. The explosion and fire caused $2,735,339 of property damage. The Columbia Gas Transmission Corporation's 30-inch diameter pipeline ruptured due to earth movement (a landslide on an unstable slope) which stressed and buckled the steel pipe installed in 1969.
 On September 20, at around 22:10 a gasoline leak from an 8-inch pipeline operated by Cenex Pipeline (terminal) was discovered near Glendive, Montana. Several trenches were constructed near the ruptured pipe for product collection points.
 On October 8, 2002, in St. John The Baptist County, Louisiana, a natural gas transmission pipeline failed due to a pinhole leak in the seam of a joint in a 20-inch diameter pipe on Bridgeline Gas Distribution's Riverlands system. The pipeline was installed in 1962. The seam failure was barely visible to the naked eye.
 On November 2, a Chevron pipeline ruptured near Corinne, Utah, spilling about 450 barrels of petroleum. The cause was from external corrosion.
On November 27, a construction crew had hit a gas line in Lafayette, Indiana. The first of 4 individual house explosions happened about 20 minutes later. 4 people were injured.
 On December 10, a farmer plowing a field hit and ruptured a Williams Companies pipeline, near Lawrence, Kansas. About 4,700 gallons of gasoline were spilled. Later, it was noted that particular pipeline lacked soil coverage in places, including some exposed spots. There were no injuries.

References 

Lists of pipeline accidents in the United States
2002 disasters in the United States